Étoile de Dakar (“Star of Dakar”) were a leading music group of Senegal in the late 1970s and early 1980s. Youssou N'Dour was one of the singers in the band and the band was a major part of N'Dour's rise to stardom in Senegal.

The group was formed in 1978 by Badou Ndiaye and several other members of the Star Band after a dispute with Ibra Kasse, the band leader of the Star Band and the owner of the Miami nightclub in Dakar where the Star Band performed. The Star Band was one of Dakar's best known nightclub house bands of the 1960s and 1970s. After Kasse fired one of the members of the Star Band, several other members quit in support of the musician, joining forces to create Étoile de Dakar. Singer El Hadji Faye who previously sang for the Star Band but left because he did not get along with Ibra Kasse, was recruited at the outset. Later singer Mar Seck, from No. 1 de Dakar, was brought into the band.

Étoile de Dakar played an important part in the evolution of Senegalese music, helping incorporate elements of traditional Senegalese music into the popular Latin-influence dance styles that dominated, helping to create a style that became known as Mbalax. They quickly became one of the city's most popular bands benefiting from the introduction of cassettes in Senegal. Previous bands had released their work on LPs which made their music less accessible to the general population of Senegal than cassette tapes. Their song "Jalo" was included on the Island Records compilation Sound d’Afrique, which was important in bringing African music to western ears in 1981.

Despite their success, the group was short-lived due to internal problems. In 1981, Étoile de Dakar split into two groups, Étoile 2000 and Super Étoile de Dakar. Étoile 2000 featured singers El Hadji Faye and Eric M'Backe and other members of Étoile de Dakar. Étoile 2000 debuted with a hit song, "Boubacar N'gary", that was reportedly played all day long by one Senegalese radio station. After three similar sounding cassette albums, the band called it quits. Youssou N'Dour and other members formed Super Étoile de Dakar which produced four albums on cassette in just a few months and eventually evolved into N'Dour's backing band. Mar Seck returned to No. 1 de Dakar.

Band members
Youssou N'Dour – lead vocals
El Hadji Faye – lead vocals
Eric M'Backe N'Doye – lead vocals
Mar Seck – lead vocals
Alla Seck – vocals, maracas
Badou N'Diaye – lead guitar
Jimi Mbaye – lead guitar (replaced Badou N'Diaye circa 1980)
Alpha Seyni Kante – rhythm guitar
Kabou Gueye – bass
Rane Diallo – alto sax
Diogomaye – sax
Mark Sambou – trumpet
Matar Gueye – congas
Abdou Fall – timbales
Assane Thiam – tama

Discography

Senegalese Albums
 Xalis (1978)
 Absa Gueye (1980)
 Tolou Badou N`Diaye (1980)
 Mbalakh Vol.1 
 Thiapathoily
 Maleo Vol.5
 Bou Bess Bi - Thiapathioly

European Compilations
 Étoile De Dakar - Xalis, Popular African Music, pam adc 303, 1994
 Étoile De Dakar Featuring Youssou N'Dour - Volume 1: Absa Gueye, Stern's Africa, STCD 3004, 1993
 Étoile De Dakar Featuring Youssou N'Dour & El Hadji Faye - Volume 2: Thiapathioly, Stern's Africa, 1994
 Étoile De Dakar Featuring Youssou N'Dour & El Hadj Faye - Volume 3: Lay Suma Lay, Stern's Africa, STCD 3012, 1996
 Étoile De Dakar Featuring Youssou N'Dour, Mar Seck & El Hadji Faye - Volume 4: Khaley Étoile, Stern's Africa, STCD 3014, 1998
 Youssou N'Dour & Étoile De Dakar - The Rough Guide To Youssou N'Dour & Étoile De Dakar, World Music Network, RGNET 1109, 2002 (includes two songs from Super Étoile de Dakar's first album)
 Étoile De Dakar - Once Upon A Time In Senegal - The Birth Of Mbalax 1979-1981, Stern's Music, STCD3054-55, 2010

References 

Musical groups established in 1979
Dakar
Senegalese musical groups
1979 establishments in Senegal